Ericodesma aerodana is a species of moth of the family Tortricidae. It is endemic to New Zealand and is found in the North and South Islands. The species inhabits sand dunes and larvae feed on Pimelea prostrata. Adults are on the wing from October to January and are active at twilight. This species is classified as "At Risk, Declining" by the Department of Conservation as its larval host plant is under threat from habitat loss and the invasive to New Zealand plant, sea spurge.

Taxonomy 
This moth was first described by Edward Meyrick in 1881 using specimens collected in Hamilton in January. He named the species Tortrix aerodana. George Vernon Hudson discussed and illustrated this species in his 1928 book under the names Tortrix indigestana as well as T. aerodana. In 1971 John S. Dugdale assigned T. aerodana to the genus Ericodesma. The lectotype specimen is held at the Natural History Museum, London.

Description 
Meyrick described the moth as follows:

Distribution 
This species is endemic to New Zealand. The species can be found in Waikato, Bay of Plenty, Taupo, Taranaki, Whanganui, Wellington, Marlborough & Marlborough Sounds, Kaikoura, Mid Canterbury.

Biology, behaviour and habitat 
Adults are on wing from October to January. Adult moths are active at twilight. E. areodana inhabits sand dune habitat.

Host species 

The larvae feed on Pimelea prostrata.

Conservation Status 
This species has been classified as having the "At Risk, Declining" conservation status under the New Zealand Threat Classification System. The survival of this moth is dependent upon the survival of its host plants. These are under threat as a result of habitat loss. The moth and its host plant is also under threat by the sea spurge.

References

 

Moths described in 1881
Archipini
Moths of New Zealand
Endemic fauna of New Zealand
Endangered biota of New Zealand
Taxa named by Edward Meyrick
Endemic moths of New Zealand